The 1971 ICF Canoe Sprint World Championships were held in Belgrade, Yugoslavia.

The men's competition consisted of six canoe (single paddle, open boat) and nine kayak events. Three events were held for women, all in kayak. C-1 500 m and C-2 500 m events debuted at this ICF Canoe Sprint World Championships, the ninth Championships in canoe sprint.

Medal summary

Men's

Canoe

Kayak

Women's

Kayak

Medals table

References
ICF medalists for Olympic and World Championships - Part 1: flatwater (now sprint): 1936-2007.
ICF medalists for Olympic and World Championships - Part 2: rest of flatwater (now sprint) and remaining canoeing disciplines: 1936-2007.
 Results at Canoeresults.eu

Icf Canoe Sprint World Championships, 1971
Icf Canoe Sprint World Championships, 1971
ICF Canoe Sprint World Championships
International sports competitions in Belgrade
International sports competitions hosted by Yugoslavia
Canoeing and kayaking competitions in Yugoslavia